Rehal Kalandrian is situated in Bishnah tehsil and located in Jammu district of Jammu and Kashmir. It is one of 116 villages in Bishnah Block along with villages like Rehal Dhamalian and Poondowal.

References

External links
The Rehal Kalandrian

Villages in Jammu district